Vox (Latin for 'voice') may refer to:

Arts, entertainment and media

Fictional characters
 Vox (DC Universe character), Mal Duncan
 Vox, several characters in the anime series Lagrange: The Flower of Rin-ne
 Gleeman Vox, from the Ratchet & Clank video game series
 Vox, a character in the animated web series Hazbin Hotel; see List of Hazbin Hotel and Helluva Boss characters

Literature
 Vox (Nicholson Baker novel), 1992
 Vox (Stewart and Riddell novel), 2003

Music
 "Vox" (song), by Sarah McLachlan, 1988
 Vox Records (Germany), a German record label
 Vox Records, an American record label

Television and radio 
 VOX (Norwegian TV channel)
 VOX (German TV channel)
 MAtv, formerly Vox, a Canadian TV channel
 Vox, a former satellite radio channel
 Radio Vox T, a Romanian radio station
 WVOX, a radio station licensed to New Rochelle, New York, U.S.

Media
 Vox Media, an American digital media company
 Vox (website), an American news and opinion website 
 Vox (magazine), a defunct British music tabloid
 Vox Magazine, produced by the Columbia Missourian

Other uses in arts, entertainment and media
 Vox (video game), 2012
 Electro-Vox Recording Studios, or Vox, a recording studio in Hollywood, California

Businesses and organisations
 Vox (company), a British musical equipment manufacturer
 Vox (political party), in Spain
 Vox Talent, a Canadian talent agency
 Vox Telecom, South African ISP

People
 Vox Day (Theodore Robert Beale, born 1968), American activist
 Victoria Vox (Victoria Davitt, born 1978), American singer and ukulele player

Science and technology
 A voice-operated switch
 Vox (blogging platform)
 VOX (file format), or Dialogic ADPCM, an audio file format
 Dudek Vox, a Polish paraglider
 HTC Vox, or HTC S710, a mobile phone

Other uses
 Vox (vodka), a Dutch vodka
 HMS Vox, two submarines of the Royal Navy
 Vox-ATypI classification, in typography

See also

 Vox Dei (disambiguation)
 Vox humana (disambiguation)
 Vox populi (disambiguation)
 Ultravox (disambiguation)
 Voxx (disambiguation)